Kim Wood (born June 23, 1969 in Hollywood, California) is an American writer and filmmaker.

Works
Her work, based upon the histories of relatively unknown adventurers and eccentrics, includes the Sundance Film Festival premiered Advice to Adventurous Girls, and On My Knees, starring Melora Creager, based on the diaries of Hannah Cullwick.

Awards
Wood has received the Silver Hugo from the Chicago International Film Festival and the Director's Citation from Thomas Edison's Black Maria Film Festival 

She is a recipient of grants from the Film Arts Foundation  and the Jerome Foundation, and is a MacDowell Colony fellow.

Festivals
Her work has screened internationally in festivals and museum exhibits, including the Guggenheim Museum's The Art of the Motorcycle, where she shared the bill with an episode of CHiPs.

Filmography
 Wanderlust (1995)
 Advice to Adventurous Girls (1998)
 On My Knees (2003)

References

20th-century American novelists
21st-century American novelists
Novelists from New York (state)
American women novelists
Living people
1969 births
20th-century American women writers
21st-century American women writers